Taalib Hassan Johnson (born September 16, 1977), better known by the stage name Musiq Soulchild or simply Musiq (pronounced "music") is an American singer and songwriter whose style blends R&B, funk, blues, jazz, and gospel influences fused with hip hop. Soulchild has released several successful studio albums that went platinum in the United States.

Early life
Musiq was born in Philadelphia, Pennsylvania, and raised in a strict Muslim household. During his teenage years he built a reputation for being musically gifted, beat boxing for MCs freestyling on the open mic circuit, scatting at jazz clubs, or just performing an a cappella for strangers on the streets, which is where he got the name "Musiq" and later added "Soulchild." He cites as his inspirations such icons as Marvin Gaye, Stevie Wonder, and Donny Hathaway. He dropped out of high school to pursue a career in music.

Career

1998–2004: Def Soul
In 1998, Musiq Soulchild signed with Def Soul Records, the contemporary R&B division of Universal Music's Def Jam Recordings. He later released his debut album, Aijuswanaseing, in late 2000. Its lead single was "Just Friends (Sunny)." His second single "Love" spent 22 weeks on the Billboard Hot 100 charts.

Musiq's second album, 2002's Juslisen, debuted at number one on both the Billboard 200 and R&B/Hip-Hop Albums, reaching platinum-sales status. The singles were "Halfcrazy" and "Dontchange," which were top ten hits.

In 2003, Musiq released his third album, Soulstar, which went gold. It included the singles "Forthenight" and "Whoknows."

Musiq took a four-year break and changed his management to Solqi Management. In 2006, media outlets circulated that Musiq was involved in a de facto record label trade, transitioning from Def Soul's master label Def Jam Recordings to Atlantic Records, and sending rapper Fabolous from Atlantic to Def Jam.

2006–2012: Atlantic Records
In March 2007, Musiq's released his fourth album Luvanmusiq. Its singles were "B.U.D.D.Y.," an uptempo track, "Teachme," and "Makeyouhappy."

His fifth album OnMyRadio was released on December 2, 2008. The lead single "Radio" was a complete contrast to the usual smooth neo soul Musiq fans were accustomed to. The following singles were the duet IfULeave featuring Mary J. Blige, and the ballad SoBeautiful. The latter marked the first collaboration between Musiq and producer JR Hutson, after Hutson had spent "about eight months" trying to get Musiq to come by his studio. According to Hutson, the two plan to work together again.

In May 2010, he changed management to Victor Grieg.

His last album for Atlantic MusiqInTheMagiq was released on May 3, 2011, available on CDs and also as a digital download. The first single was "Anything" featuring Swizz Beatz, followed by "Yes".

2013–present My Block Records, Soulstar Music Company, eOne Records
In September 2013, Musiq released a duet album with Syleena Johnson entitled 9ine. This album was a compilation of nine reggae songs recorded in nine days on the independent Shanachie label.

Also in September 2013, Musiq announced his departure from Atlantic Records and becoming an independent artist. He revealed he is now signed to record producer Warryn Campbell's label My Block Records. Musiq previously worked with Campbell on his first two albums on Atlantic – 2007's Luvanmusiq and 2008's OnMyRadio.

He released an EP titled The Husel through DatPiff on July 30, 2014.

In April 2016, he released his first independent solo album through My Block/E1 Music, Life on Earth. The lead single is "I Do". Shortly after, he moved to a new label, with eOne/SoulStar Music Company.

In 2017, he released two new singles "Simple Things" and "Start Over" set for a new album titled Feel the Real due on September 15, 2017. He premiered music videos for the tracks in April 2017.

Other music
Musiq Soulchild has featured on 
the song "Nothing at All" from Carlos Santana's October 2002 album Shaman; 
The Roots's November 2002 Phrenology on the song "Break You Off";   
rapper Skillz's December 2002 I Ain't Mad No More on the song "Wave Ya Hands!";   
"Are You Experienced?" in March 2004's Power of Soul: A Tribute to Jimi Hendrix album; 
Black Ice's September 2006 The Death of Willie Lynch on the song "Takeyatime";  
rapper Lloyd Banks's October 2006 album Rotten Apple on the song Addicted;  
"Reasons" on the March 2007 tribute album Interpretations: Celebrating the Music of Earth, Wind & Fire; 
on Talib Kweli's August 2007 album Eardrum on the song "Oh My Stars";  
 Ice Cube's August 2008 album Raw Footage on the song "Why Me?";
 Rapsody's November 2017 album Laila's Wisdom on the song "A Rollercoaster Jam Called Love";
 Kehlani's February 2019 mixtape While We Wait on the song "Footsteps";
 Smif-N-Wessun's March 2019 album The All on the song "Ocean Drive.

Soundtrack songs
Soulchild has also appeared on the soundtrack to Tyler Perry's February 2007 movie Daddy's Little Girls.

He also lent a song from his March 2007 album Luvanmusiq to the soundtrack for Perry's later movie Why Did I Get Married?, released October 2007.

He then recorded a remake of Arrested Development's song "People Everyday" with British rapper and singer Estelle for the soundtrack to Tyler Perry's March 2008 Meet the Browns entitled "People Everyday (Metamorphosis Mix)".

Television and books
Musiq guest starred as himself in the UPN sitcom Half and Half in May 2004 and The CW comedy The Game in October 2007.

On June 25, 2012, Musiq released a book on love and relationships entitled "143 – Love According To Musiq".

Personal life
Musiq resides in Atlanta, Georgia.

In 2009, he had a son with 702 singer Kameelah Williams. He also has a daughter named Satori, born in 2017.

When Musiq was a young child he developed a lazy eye from an accident that occurred while being fed by his uncle.

Discography

Studio albums

Collaboration albums

EPs

Singles

As featured artist

Accolades
Soulchild has two platinum as well as two gold albums altogether.

He's as well been bestowed with awards from BET and the ASCAP among others.

Soulchild has also received 13 Grammy nominations, including 3 for his 2007 album Luvanmusiq.

ASCAP Awards

|-
| align="center" | 2002 ASCAP Awards
| Musiq Soulchild
| Best Male R&B Artist
| 
|-

BET Awards

|-
| align="center" | 2001
| Musiq Soulchild
| Best Male R&B Artist
| 
|-
| align="center" | 2001
| Musiq Soulchild
| Best New Artist
| 
|-
| align="center" | 2003
| Musiq Soulchild
| Best Male R&B Artist
| 
|-
| align="center" | 2007
| Musiq Soulchild
| BET Centric Award
| 
|-
| align="center" | 2009
| Musiq Soulchild
| BET J Award
| 
|-

American Music Awards
 

|-
| align="center" | 2002
| Musiq Soulchild
| Favorite Soul/R&B New Artist
| 
|-

Grammy Awards

|-
| align="center" | 2002
| "Love"
| Best Male R&B Vocal Performance
| 
|-
| align="center" rowspan="2"| 2003
| "Halfcrazy"
| Best Male R&B Vocal Performance
| 
|-
| Juslisen
| Best R&B Album
| 
|-
| align="center" | 2004
| "Forthenight"
| Best Urban/Alternative Performance
| 
|-
| align="center" | 2005
| "Are You Experienced?"
| Best Urban/Alternative Performance
| 
|-
| align="center" rowspan="2"| 2008
| "B.U.D.D.Y."
| Best Male R&B Vocal Performance
| 
|-
| Luvanmusiq
| Best R&B Album
| 
|-
| align="center" rowspan="3"| 2010
| "SoBeautiful"
| Best Male R&B Vocal Performance
| 
|-
| "IfULeave" (feat. Mary J. Blige)
| rowspan="2"| Best R&B Performance by a Duo or Group with Vocals
| 
|-
| "Chocolate High" (with India.Arie)
| 
|-
| align="center" | 2011
| "We're Still Friends"
| Best Male R&B Vocal Performance
| 
|-
| align="center" | 2017
| "I Do"
| Best R&B Performance
| 
|-
| align="center" rowspan="1"| 2018
| Feel the Real
| Best R&B Album
| 
|-

References

External links
Official website
[ Musiq Soulchild's AllMusic page]

1977 births
Living people
20th-century African-American male singers
American neo soul singers
Musicians from Philadelphia
Atlantic Records artists
Singers from Pennsylvania
American contemporary R&B singers
Ballad musicians
21st-century American singers
21st-century American male singers
21st-century African-American male singers